Okol Rocks (‘Skali Okol’ ska-'li o-'kol) is a group of rocks in the north of Aitcho Islands group on the west side of English Strait in the South Shetland Islands, Antarctica. The principal feature in the group is Lambert Island
().

The area was visited by early 19th century sealers operating from nearby Clothier Harbour.

Okol Rocks are named after the settlements of Gorni (Upper) Okol and Dolni (Lower) Okol in western Bulgaria. Lambert Island is named after Rear Admiral Nick Lambert, national hydrographer (2010–2012) and commanding officer of HMS Endurance (2005–2007).  Passage Rock was charted by Discovery Investigations personnel in 1935 and later descriptively named for being a leading mark for ships entering English Strait.  Cheshire Rock is named after Lieutenant Commander Peter Cheshire, leader of the Royal Navy Hydrographic Survey Unit in the area in 1967.

Location

See also 
 Composite Antarctic Gazetteer
 List of Antarctic islands south of 60° S
 SCAR
 Territorial claims in Antarctica

Maps
 L.L. Ivanov. Antarctica: Livingston Island and Greenwich, Robert, Snow and Smith Islands. Scale 1:120000 topographic map.  Troyan: Manfred Wörner Foundation, 2009.

Notes

References
 Bulgarian Antarctic Gazetteer. Antarctic Place-names Commission. (details in Bulgarian, basic data in English)

External links
 Okol Rocks. Copernix satellite image

Rock formations of Greenwich Island
Bulgaria and the Antarctic